TCS stands for Tranzum Courier Service. TCS is a Pakistani courier and logistics company which is based in Karachi, Pakistan. It was founded by a former Pakistan International Airlines (PIA) flight engineer, Khalid Nawaz Awan, in 1983

History
TCS was founded by a former Pakistan International Airlines (PIA) flight engineer, Khalid Awan, as a joint venture with German courier company DHL in 1983.

Operations
TCS maintains several thousand locations within Pakistan and worldwide as well as delivery vehicles and couriers. TCS has been assigned machine readable passports (MRPs) delivery services by the government, and Visa application submission and delivery services by embassies. 

People can also track their order online.

Yayvo

Yayvo.com, previously known as TCS Connect, is a Pakistani online retailer operating as a subsidiary of TCS. It was founded in 2012 and competes with online retailer Daraz, which was acquired by Alibaba.

Fleet
TCS maintains a dedicated cargo fleet consisting of the following aircraft:

References

Airlines of Pakistan
Airlines established in 1983
Companies based in Karachi 
Transport companies established in 1983
Logistics companies of Pakistan
Cargo airlines
Aircraft ground handling companies
Pakistani brands
Pakistani companies established in 1993
Privately held companies of Pakistan
[]